Outsourced is an American sitcom television series set in an Indian workplace. It is based on the film of the same name and adapted by Robert Borden for Universal Media Studios and NBC. The series originally ran from September 23, 2010 to May 12, 2011. The show was officially picked up by NBC on May 7, 2010 and on October 18, 2010, the show received a full season order. Outsourced was filmed at Radford Studios in Studio City, Los Angeles, California.

When the renewal of the show was not announced with renewal of other NBC shows, the cast and crew started a campaign for fans of the show to request its renewal. On May 13, 2011, NBC announced that Outsourced was cancelled after one season.

Outsourced is set in a call center in Mumbai, India, where an American novelties company has recently outsourced its order processing. A lone American manages the call center and must explain American popular culture to his employees as he tries to understand Indian culture.

Cast and characters

Main
 Ben Rappaport as Todd Dempsy, a Kansas City native who is transferred to India to run the call center for Mid American Novelties. He does not understand Indian culture and is constantly offending workers unintentionally. He eventually becomes more aware of Indian culture. He is currently employed as executive manager.
 Rizwan Manji as Rajiv Gidwani, Todd's assistant manager at Mid American Novelties. He is hard-nosed and unapologetic and he aspires to be Todd's replacement (whether due to Todd's success or his downfall). When Todd is promoted to executive manager, Rajiv is promoted to manager. His intentions are not to be mean, but to only run the company professionally and business-like. It has long been his dream to become a successful business manager so he can gain the approval of the wealthy father of Vimi, whom he has loved since childhood and wishes to marry. Once he becomes manager, he marries Vimi.
 Sacha Dhawan as Manmeet, a call center employee for Mid American Novelties, who dreams of America and quickly becomes good friends with his boss, Todd Dempsy. He is known for being the "hip" one, who is fascinated by American culture. Manmeet is girl-crazy; he has had several "over the phone" relationships with American callers and flirts with almost every woman he meets. He seems more interested in American women than Indian women, stating in one episode that American women are not concerned with his father's occupation or where he went to school. This, along with his reluctance to ask one of Tonya's friends to dance at a Halloween party, indicates that Manmeet may actually have a bit of an inferiority complex.
 Rebecca Hazlewood as Asha, a call center employee for Mid American Novelties and eventual love interest of Todd. She is frequently the voice of reason in the office and plans to pursue an arranged marriage. Early in the series, Todd develops feelings for Asha, who, while responding in some ways, eventually re-asserts her commitment to the arranged marriage process, leading Todd to develop a relationship with Tonya. In the penultimate episode, Tonya breaks up with Todd because he still has feelings for Asha. In the last scene of the finale, Asha, having earlier expressed doubts about her fiancé, tells Todd he should fight for what he wants, and takes his hand as they gaze at the celebratory crowd at Rajiv and Vimi's wedding, strongly implying that she wants him to fight for her because of her feelings for him as well.
 Parvesh Cheena as Gupta, a very talkative call center employee for Mid American Novelties, who constantly yearns to be the center of attention. After Todd inspires him to grab some independence from his parents, Gupta rents his own place in the apartment directly above Todd's.
 Anisha Nagarajan as Madhuri, a shy and soft-spoken call center employee for Mid American Novelties whose income supports her entire family. As time passes, Madhuri opens up, becoming one of the office gossips. Madhuri also has a beautiful singing voice, and the others convince her to enter a singing contest.
 Diedrich Bader as American Charlie Davies, a call center manager for the company All-American Hunter. Charlie is friendly and has good intentions but is somewhat socially clueless and a bit gruff, leading to many humorous situations. For several episodes, Charlie nurses a crush on Tonya, convinced he has a chance at a relationship despite her obvious disinterest in him romantically.
 Pippa Black as Tonya, an Australian call center manager for the company Koala Airlines who is easygoing and flirtatious with a sense of adventure; by mid-season, she and Todd are romantically involved and remain so until just before the end of the series.

Recurring
 Guru Singh as Ajeet, a tall, silent Sikh whose character frequently shows displeasure at Todd's cultural gaffes. A poet, he first speaks in the season finale, where he becomes Madhuri's love interest and his character is given a more prominent role.
 Thushari Jayasekera as Pinky, a fun and hardworking call center worker at Mid America Novelties, who is adventure seeking and ready to learn. Does funny and awkward things. Ready to defend her fellow call center team as well as party with the big boss. Played largest role in the season finale.
 Manish Dayal and the A-Team, a group of well-dressed executive employees for a computer support call center located in the same building. The group are conspicuously rude, snobby, and taunting.
 Jerry Stern (played by Matt Walsh), Todd's supervisor in the U.S.; he is business focused and often reminds Todd of tough choices Todd is reluctant to make, such as firing a staff member due to poor sales. 
Santosh, the maid at Todd's apartment.
Vimi, (played by Sarayu Rao in the Jolly Vindaloo Day episodes and Noureen DeWulf in later episodes), Rajiv's fiancée and eventual wife.
Shivam Tibrewala as call center playboy.

Episodes

International broadcast
Outsourced was picked up in Canada, for broadcast on Global at the same time as the American broadcast. In New Zealand, Outsourced has been broadcast on FOUR.

Outsourced has been broadcast in Singapore, Indonesia, Thailand, and Hong Kong on Universal. In Brazil, Outsourced has been broadcast on Rede Record, premiered on November 5, 2011, with the title Aprontando na Índia. It is also being broadcast on TBS. In Sweden, Outsourced has been broadcast on TV3 and TV6. In Poland, Outsourced (Dostawa na telefon) has been broadcast on Comedy Central Poland.

Reception
The show received mixed reviews, reaching a 46 out of 100 on review aggregator Metacritic. Another review aggregator, Rotten Tomatoes, gives the show a rating of 21% based on 14 reviews, with the critical consensus, "This culture-clash sitcom is too mired in unfunny jokes and stereotypical characters to provide much insight into the global marketplace." Joel Keller of TV Squad in a review of the pilot episode stated, "As long as the show can examine the cultural divide, show how all offices are the same no matter where they are, and stay away from the easy jokes, NBC could have another Thursday comedy hit." Alessandra Stanley of The New York Times stated "The fact that it's neither embarrassing nor deeply offensive—once it gets rolling, the show is actually quite charming—is a credit to the cast and the writers." Critics such as blogger Mikey O'Connell have accused Outsourced of being racist. Matt Rouse of TV Guide wrote, "The culture clash premise drowns in a sewer of caricatures and lame jokes".

Awards and nominations

See also
Mumbai Calling, a 2007 British sitcom with a similar premise.
Outsourced (film), a 2006 movie from which the TV show takes its inspiration.

References

External links

Outsourced Pilot Table Read (2020)—read by the original cast on the occasion of the show's 10th anniversary

2010s American workplace comedy television series
2010s American single-camera sitcoms
2010 American television series debuts
2011 American television series endings
English-language television shows
NBC original programming
Live action television shows based on films
Television series by Universal Television
Television shows set in Mumbai
Outsourcing in India
Indian-American television